Alonzo Bodden (born June 13, 1962) is an American comedian and actor known for winning the grand prize in the third season of the reality-television series Last Comic Standing. He had been the runner-up in the previous season.

In 2007, he released his DVD Tall, Dark and Funny. He was a talent judge in NBC's 5th season of Last Comic Standing, along with Kathleen Madigan and ANT. He is also a television host and voice-over actor, and is a regular panelist on the radio quiz program Wait Wait... Don't Tell Me!.

Early life
Alonzo Bodden was born and raised in the Saint Albans area of Queens, New York City. His mother was African American; his father was black Honduran.

Before his work in show business, Bodden went to Aviation High School in Long Island City, New York.  He went on to work for Lockheed Martin and McDonnell Douglas in Long Beach in the training department in the early ’90s.

Television
He hosted the Speed TV program 101 Cars You Must Drive. He is also a host for America's Worst Driver. He also guest starred on Angel.

He has performed on numerous television shows, including The Tonight Show with Jay Leno, Late Night with Conan O'Brien, Make Me Laugh, Late Friday, The Late Late Show with Craig Kilborn, Comedy Central Presents, and It's Showtime at the Apollo. He is also a voice actor who has worked on Power Rangers: Lightspeed Rescue, Masked Rider, and O'Grady.

He is a co-host of Inside the Vault on WGN America.

In 2011, he was a panelist on a BBC America year-end television debut special of Wait Wait... Don't Tell Me! He is also a recurring panelist currently on the Wait Wait... Don't Tell Me! weekly NPR show and podcast.

During 2014, he was a comedic panelist on Game Show Network's original series Mind of a Man.

In 2019, he released his special Heavy Lightweight on Amazon Prime Video.

Filmography

Movies
 8 Guys (2003) (short film)
 Bringing Down the House (2003)
 The Girl Next Door (2004)
 Scary Movie 4 (2006)
 National Lampoon's Totally Baked: A Potumentary (2007)
 Why We Ride (2013)

Television
 Fresh Off the Boat (2018) – Mr. Carlson
 Alonzo Bodden: Historically Incorrect  (2016) - Himself
 Californication (2014)
 America's Worst Driver (2010) 
 Angel (2003) – Eddie Rhodes

Voice-over
Masked Rider – Ultivore (voice)
Power Rangers: Lightspeed Rescue – Thunderon (voice)
Fallout 76: Wastelanders – Aubrie Willem, Dontrelle Haines (voice)

DVD release
Tall, Dark and Funny (2007)

Radio
Bodden frequently appears as a panelist on NPR's news quiz show Wait Wait... Don't Tell Me!. He has also been a guest on The Joe Rogan Experience and on The Adam Carolla Show.

Family Feud Live
In 2019, Bodden was tapped to host Family Feud Live, a live traveling version of the game show Family Feud, which also featured celebrity "team captains" Brian Baumgartner, Cathy Rigby and "Grocery Store Joe" Amabile.

Personal life
Bodden is a car and motorcycle enthusiast. In addition to an e92 BMW M3 and JCW Mini Cooper, Bodden owns many motorcycles, including a Triumph Rocket III, a Triumph Speed Triple, a Ducati 1098, a BMW HP2, and a Ducati Multistrada, and formerly owned a Honda CB400F. In 2010, Bodden highsided his Ducati 1098 while racing at Buttonwillow Raceway Park. The crash shattered his scaphoid, requiring surgeries and a bone graft to fix. In 2011, he had customizer Nick Anglada rebuild the bike in a bare aluminum and anodized gold palette.

On March 26, 2013, Bodden donated a kidney to his brother, who is three years older.

References

External links

Official website
Interview on Adam Carolla's podcast
 Alonzo on recently donating a kidney to his brother
 Alonzo Bodden biography on clean and sober comedy site Recovery Comedy

1962 births
African-American male comedians
American male comedians
African-American male actors
American male voice actors
American people of Honduran descent
Living people
Last Comic Standing winners
Male actors from New York City
People from St. Albans, Queens
Comedians from New York City
20th-century American comedians
21st-century American comedians
20th-century African-American people
21st-century African-American people